Chris Barker (born August 3, 1990) is a former American football offensive guard. He played college football at Nevada. He was signed by the Miami Dolphins as an undrafted free agent in 2013.

Professional career

Miami Dolphins
On May 3, 2013, he signed with the Miami Dolphins as an undrafted free agent. On August 31, 2013, he was released.

New England Patriots
On September 1, 2013, Barker was claimed off waivers by the New England Patriots.
On September 1, 2014, Barker was waived by the New England Patriots and was re-signed to the practice squad. On October 16, Barker was elevated to the active roster. On October 28, he was waived by the Patriots and was re-signed to the Patriots' practice squad.
Barker won Super Bowl XLIX with the Patriots after they defeated the defending champion Seattle Seahawks 28–24.

On February 5, 2015, Barker was signed by the Patriots. On September 1, 2015, Barker was released by the Patriots. He was signed to the team's practice squad on September 7, but was released two days later. On September 19, 2015, Barker was re-signed to the practice squad. On September 30, 2015, he was released again. He was re-signed to the Patriots' practice squad again on October 9, 2015. On November 14, 2015, Barker was elevated to the active roster. On November 17, 2015, he was waived by the Patriots. On November 19, 2015, Barker was re-signed to the Patriots' practice squad. On January 26, 2016, Barker signed a futures contract with the New England Patriots.

On September 3, 2016, Barker was released by the Patriots as part of final roster cuts and was signed to the Patriots' practice squad the next day. Barker spent the entire 2016 season on the practice squad.

On February 5, 2017, Barker's Patriots appeared in Super Bowl LI. In the game, the Patriots defeated the Atlanta Falcons by a score of 34–28 in overtime.

On February 7, 2017, Barker signed a futures contract with the Patriots.

On May 18, 2017, Barker was released by the Patriots.

Cleveland Browns
On May 19, 2017, Barker was claimed off waivers by the Cleveland Browns. He was waived/injured by the Browns on July 30, 2017, after sustaining an Achilles injury during the Browns' 2017 training camp and placed on injured reserve.

References

External links
Nevada bio
Miami Dolphins bio
New England Patriots bio

1990 births
Living people
Players of American football from California
Sportspeople from Los Angeles County, California
People from Covina, California
American football offensive guards
Nevada Wolf Pack football players
Miami Dolphins players
New England Patriots players
Cleveland Browns players